Jack Dolan (14 June 1906 – 5 March 2001) was an Australian rules footballer who played with Essendon in the Victorian Football League (VFL).

Notes

External links 
		

1906 births
2001 deaths
Australian rules footballers from Melbourne
Essendon Football Club players
People from Essendon, Victoria